Get Cape. Wear Cape. Fly is the debut EP of Sam Duckworth, who performs under the name Get Cape. Wear Cape. Fly. It was released in tandem with a video for "Whitewash is Brainwash", which sees Get Cape. Wear Cape. Fly travelling around on the London Underground and performing a secret show in Bank Tube Station.

Track listing
Whitewash is Brainwash
Glasshouses
I-Spy
Get Cape. Wear Cape. Fly
A Song For

References

Get Cape. Wear Cape. Fly albums
2005 EPs